USS Vandalia has been the name of four ships in the service of the United States Navy.  All of the ships are named after Vandalia, Illinois.

 , an 18-gun sloop-of-war
 , a screw sloop
 , originally known as Walter Jennings, a twin-screw, steel-hulled tanker, acquired by the Navy in 1944 and sank in a typhoon in 1945.
 , a submarine chaser which served from 1943 until 1946.

United States Navy ship names